Murphy is an unincorporated community in Buchanan County, Virginia, in the United States.

History
A post office called Murphy was established in 1901, and remained in operation until it was discontinued in 1963. Robert Murphy served as postmaster.

References

Unincorporated communities in Buchanan County, Virginia
Unincorporated communities in Virginia